Pyae Phyo Aung (born 19 November 1987) is a footballer from Burma, and a defender for Myanmar national football team and Yangon United. He is the three-time Myanmar National League winner with Yangon United.

International career
He is currently part of the Myanmar national beach soccer team.

International goals

References

External links
 

1987 births
Living people
People from Shan State
Burmese footballers
Myanmar international footballers
Yangon United F.C. players
Association football defenders